Eupithecia acyrtoterma is a moth in the family Geometridae. It is found in northern Myanmar.

Adults are pale grey on both the fore- and hindwings.

References

Moths described in 1926
acyrtoterma
Moths of Asia